Aristotle Condenuevo Pollisco (born October 18, 1977), known professionally as Gloc-9, is a Filipino rapper, singer, and songwriter. Regarded as one of the best Filipino rappers of all-time, his fast-flowing vocal style has made him one of the best-selling and most successful hip-hop artists in the Philippines. He was described by fellow Filipino rapper Francis Magalona as "a blacksmith of words and letters, and a true Filipino poet."

Recognized as the Philippines' undisputed “King of Hip-Hop”, He is also referred as a trailblazer and the long-standing giant of the Pinoy Hip-Hop scene. In a career spanning 25 years, Gloc-9 has won over 60 awards including the prestigious 'Sudi National Music Award' by the National Commission of Culture and Art. He is also recipient of 2 FAMAS Awards, 21 Awit Awards, 18 Myx Music Awards and 9 PMPC Star Awards. His albums Liham at Lihim (Platinum) and MKNM: Mga Kwento Ng Makata (Gold), both earned sales certifications by the PARI. In 2019, he was inducted at the Calle Con Hall of Fame. 

He has collaborated on almost a dozen songs with other OPM artists; "Lando" with the late Francis M, "Upuan" with Jaezelle, "Bagsakan" with Parokya ni Edgar , "Baon" with  Gab Chee Kee  of Parokya ni Edgar and Francis M, and "Sari-Saring Kwento" with Noel Cabangon and Champ Lui Pio. His songs mostly tackle social issues such as social injustices, poverty and patriotism. He began his musical career with the gangsta rap group Death Threat.

Gloc-9 is notably one of the few artists in the Philippine music scene who has won an award in almost every album he released.

Career

In Death Threat
In his song Talumpati, Gloc-9 states that he joined a drive-by show by Andrew E. After the show, a member of the Filipino hip hop group Death Threat came into him then gave a paper on which the contact number of the group's leader Beware (Ronald Salanga) was written. After a phone call with Beware, he joined the group in which he began to make a name for himself in the local underground hip hop scene. His stage name "Gloc-9" came into rising when Beware told him that he must have a rap name in order to become a rapper. A number of options were suggested: MAGNUM45 and KALIBRE28 were rejected outright, but he decided that Glock 9, minus the "k", sounded catchy.

Death Threat released several albums until one-day Beware had to leave the group and asked Gloc-9 to be the leader of the group together with Hi-Jakk (which Gloc-9 describes as a "rapper who does not know how to rap" in his song Talumpati). In 1997, Death Threat released their third album, "Kings of Da Undaground," but it only features Hi-Jakkk and Gloc-9. The album received 4× platinum certification despite having no mainstream promotion but the only word of mouth in the streets.

As duo with Hi-Jakkk
Within the same year, the duo of Gloc-9 and Hi-Jakkk started to release albums not carrying the name of Death Threat under Viva Records. These albums are Domination that was certified gold, Tha Revelation certified platinum and Domination II certified gold. In his release "Talumpati", Gloc-9 describes these albums as ones that have not been thought-out and of being full of boastfulness. After their third album together, Gloc-9 was kicked out of the group Death Threat by Beware without any clear reason. Later, Hi-Jakkk decided to leave the group and in 2021, he decided to join Andrew E.'s Dongalo Wreckords.

Solo with Star Music
While working as a duo, both Gloc-9 and Hi-Jakkk continued to submit their solo demos until the year 2000, when Christian Martinez of Star Music finally discovered Gloc-9's talent after 3 months of searching, when an executive of ABS-CBN accidentally put on his demo from a recording found in a scrap box.

At first, Gloc-9 composed and sang his own songs for soundtracks of several Star Cinema films like Trip and Jologs. In 2002, he also joined Himig Handog Love Songs, a song-writing competition operated by the ABS-CBN Corporation and Star Music with his song "Bakit?" (co-written with Mike Villegas). The song has been interpreted by him together with Cookie Chua, becoming one of the finalists in the competition but without winning the title as the grand prize went to "Kung Ako Na Lang Sana" written by Socrates Villanueva and interpreted by Bituin Escalante. In this song-writing competition, one of his competitors was Jimmy Antiporda with the song "Hindi Na Bale" performed by Jessa Zaragoza. The latter was mentioned in Gloc-9's song "Gusto Ko".

In 2003, Gloc-9 released his debut album under Star Music entitled G9. Included in this album are songs that had been used in several Star Cinema films before. His second album, Ako Si... was released in 2005 under Star Music.

In February 2021, Gloc-9 announced a new album titled Poot at Pag-ibig, which he would be releasing on YouTube one track a day from February 14–19.

Personal life
Studied Elementary in Binangonan, Rizal and studied High school in Morong, Rizal. Aristotle Pollisco studied Nursing at STI College-Fairview.

Discography

Studio albums 
 G9 (2003)
 Ako Si... (2005)
 Diploma (2007)
 Matrikula (2009)
 Talumpati (2011)
 MKNM: Mga Kwento Ng Makata (2012)
 Liham at Lihim (2013)
 Sukli (2016)
Poot at Pag-ibig (2021)

EPs and demos
 Limang Kanta Lang (2006)
 Rotonda (2017)
 TULAY (2019)

Live albums
 Biyahe ng Pangarap (2014)

Collaborative and Underground albums 
 Kings of da Undaground (with Death Threat) (1997)
 Domination (with Hi-Jakkk) (1997)
 Domination II (with Hi-Jakkk) (1999)
 Still Wanted: Da 2nd Chapter (with Death Threat) (2002)

Singles 
"Hari ng Tondo" (feat. Denise Barbacena) (from the 2011 movie Manila Kingpin: The Asiong Salonga Story)
"Isang Araw"
"Tugo-Tugo-Pak" (feat. Vhong Navarro)
"Laban, Krystala"
"Sayang"
"Ako Si"
"Simpleng Tao"
"Bakit" (feat. Cooky Chua)
"Ayoko Na"
"Masama Yan"
"Nag-iisang Mundo"
"Nginig"
"Tula"
"Ipagpatawad Mo" (feat. Dzing Macanaya)
"Love Story Ko"
"Liwanag" (feat. Francis Magalona)
"B.I."
"Jologs"
"Get 2 Know You" (feat. Keith Martin)
"Diploma"
"Lando" (feat. Francis Magalona)
"Torpedo" (feat. JP Cuison of Kiko Machine)
"Bagsakan" (feat. Parokya ni Edgar & Francis Magalona) (from their 2005 album Halina Sa Parokya)
"Sumayaw Ka"
"Upuan" (feat. Jeazell Grutas of Zelle)
"Balita" (feat. Gabby Alipe of Urbandub)
"Martilyo" (feat. Letter Day Story)
"Walang Natira" (feat. Sheng Belmonte)
"Elmer" (feat. Jaq Dionisio & Jomal Linao of Kamikazee)
"Kung Tama Siya" (feat. Jaq Dionisio)
"One Hit Combo" (feat. Parokya ni Edgar) (from their 2011 album Middle-Age Juvenile Novelty Pop-Rockers)
"Sirena" (feat. Ebe Dancel)
"Alalay ng Hari" (feat. Allan Mitchell Silonga)
"Bakit Hindi" (feat. Billy Crawford)
"Hindi Mo Nadinig" (feat. Jay Durias)
"Buti Na Lang" (feat. Mcoy Fundales of Kenyo)
"Kunwari" (Kamikazee feat. Biboy Garcia & Manuel Legarda)
"Dapat Tama" (feat. Denise Barbacena) (GMA Network Campaign for Election 2013)
"Katulad ng Iba" (feat. Zia Quizon)
"Sikat na si Pepe"
"Tinta"
"Magda" (feat. Rico Blanco)
"Siga" (feat. Quest)
"Hindi Sapat" (feat. Denise Barbacena)
"Ipaglaban Mo!" (with KZ Tandingan) (from the 2014 TV series of the same title)
"Takipsilim" (feat. Regine Velasquez-Alcasid)
"Pison" (feat. Chito Miranda)
"Bayad Ko" (feat. Noel Cabangon)
"Bugtong" (feat. Yeng Constantino)
"Inday" (feat. Cathy Go)
"Guitarero" (feat. Denise Barbacena)
"Ang Parokya" (feat. Parokya ni Edgar & Frank Magalona) (from their 2013 album Bente)
"Anting-Anting" (Sponge Cola & Denise Barbacena) (Sponge Cola's second single from their fifth album Ultrablessed)
"Booster C One Shot" (feat. Denise Barbacena)
"Kasalanan" (6cyclemind)
"The Bobo Song" (feat. Loonie)
"Tao" (feat. Cookie Chua)
"Bituwin" (feat. Allan Mitchel)
"Kaibigan Ko" (feat. The Hardware Syndrome with Itoy & Willie of the Splindicate Posse)
"Pangarap" (feat. Raimund Marasigan)
"Bahala Na" (feat. Moymoy Palaboy & Sisa of Crazy as Pinoy & Biboy)
"Liwanag" (feat. Francis Magalona)
"Ako Ay Ikaw Rin"
"Excuse Me Po"
"My Number" (feat. Mitchell)
"Usap Tayo"
"Lapis at Papel"
"Kayo" (feat. Mitchell)
"Okay Ako"
"Pangarap"
"Sila" (feat. Loonie & Konflick of Death Threat)
"Businessman" (feat. Vinci Montaner)
"Para Sa Bayan" (feat. Lirah Bermudez)
"Basta't Kasama Ka" (feat. Lirah Bermudez)
"Hinahanap ng Puso" (feat. Hannah Romawac of Session Road)
"Pareho Tayo" (feat. Allan Mitchell)
"Ang Probinsyano" (feat. Ebe Dancel)
"Hoy!"
"Sagwan" (feat. Monty Macalino of Mayonnaise)
"Industriya" (feat. KZ Tandingan)
"Ice Tubig"
"Lagi" (feat. Al James)
"Maleta" (feat. Julie Anne San Jose)
"Halik" (feat. Flow G of Ex Battalion)
"Gera Gera" (feat. Raymund Marasigan)
"Abakada" (with Mark Beats)
"Tamang Panahon" (with Pio Balbuena)
"AHON" (feat. Bugoy Drilon)
"Iba't Ibang Bangka" (feat. Monty Macalino)
"TANAN" (feat. Lirah)
"All School"
"Bahay Ni Gloc-9"
"Macho Rap" (feat. Lirah) (Inspired by Mang Tomas)
"Kantang Canton"
"Kahit Malayo"
"Sanib" (feat. Loir)
"ARAW NA ITO"
"Apoy" (feat. Third Flo')
"Luma" (Feat. Akbeats by Akuma)
"Sa 'kin 'Yan" (feat. Honcho of Ex Battalion)
"Buhay"
"Tunay"
"PASAN" (feat. Hero)
"Saranggola" (feat. Yuridope of Ex Battalion)
"Bente Kwatro"
"Langit Lupa" (feat. Hellmerry of Young God Records)
"Paliwanag" (feat. Yeng Constantino)
"Maulit Man" (feat. Grace Cristobal)
"Pag-Nagising Ako" (feat. Jillian Ita-as)
"BUHOK" (feat. Liezel Garcia)
"Bisekleta sa America"
"HEBISHRAM" (feat. Hero, Bishnu Paneru & Ramdiss)
"RESBAK" (feat. Pricetagg, Omar Baliw, CLR, & Shanti Dope)

Endorsements and appearances
2011: Protégé: The Battle for the Big Break, GMA Network Mentors
2013: Pilipinas Got Talent Season 4 Quarter Finals, Special Number
2018: The Clash Season 1  Special Number
2021: ''ASAP Natin 'To Tribute Number for Andrew E.

Awards

See also
Filipino hip hop
Death Threat (hip hop group)
Francis Magalona
List of Filipino hip hop artists
List of awards and nominations received by Gloc-9

References

External links
Official Facebook
Official Multiply
Official Youtube
Sony BMG Gloc-9 on Sony BMG Music Site

Living people
Filipino rappers
Far Eastern University alumni
21st-century Filipino male singers
Singers from Rizal
1977 births
20th-century Filipino male singers
GMA Network personalities
Sony Music Philippines artists
Star Music artists
Universal Records (Philippines) artists